In mathematical analysis, and especially in real, harmonic analysis and functional analysis, an Orlicz space is a type of function space which generalizes the Lp spaces.  Like the Lp spaces, they are Banach spaces. The spaces are named for Władysław Orlicz, who was the first to define them in 1932.

Besides the Lp spaces, a variety of function spaces arising naturally in analysis are Orlicz spaces.  One such space L log+ L, which arises in the study of Hardy–Littlewood maximal functions, consists of measurable functions f such that the integral

Here log+ is the positive part of the logarithm.  Also included in the class of Orlicz spaces are many of the most important Sobolev spaces.

Terminology 
These spaces are called Orlicz spaces by an overwhelming majority of mathematicians and by all monographies studying them, because Władysław Orlicz was the first who introduced them, in 1932. Some mathematicians, including Wojbor Woyczyński, Edwin Hewitt and Vladimir Mazya, include the name of Zygmunt Birnbaum as well, referring to his earlier joint work with Władysław Orlicz. However in the Birnbaum–Orlicz paper the Orlicz space is not introduced, neither explicitly nor implicitly, hence the name Orlicz space is preferred. By the same reasons this convention has been also openly criticized by another mathematician (and an expert in the history of Orlicz spaces), Lech Maligranda. Orlicz was confirmed as the person who introduced Orlicz spaces already by Stefan Banach in his 1932 monograph.

Formal definition

Suppose that μ is a σ-finite measure on a set X, and Φ : [0, ∞) → [0, ∞) is a Young function, i.e., a convex function such that

Let  be the set of measurable functions f : X → R such that the integral

is finite, where, as usual, functions that agree almost everywhere are identified.

This might not be a vector space (i.e., it might fail to be closed under scalar multiplication).

Note that Young's inequality for products holds:

The norm is then given by

Furthermore, the space  is precisely the space of measurable functions for which this norm is finite.

An equivalent norm, called the Luxemburg norm, is defined on LΦ by

and likewise  is the space of all measurable functions for which this norm is finite.

Example

Suppose that X is the open unit interval (0,1), Φ(x) = exp(x) – 1 – x, and f(x) = log(x). Then af is in the space  but is only in the set  if |a| < 1.

Properties

 Orlicz spaces generalize Lp spaces (for ) in the sense that if , then , so .
 The Orlicz space  is a Banach space — a complete normed vector space.

Relations to Sobolev spaces

for

Then there exist constants  such that

Orlicz norm of a random variable
Similarly, the Orlicz norm of a random variable characterizes it as follows:

This norm is homogeneous and is defined only when this set is non-empty.

When , this coincides with the p-th moment of the random variable. Other special cases in the exponential family are taken with respect to the functions  (for ). A random variable with finite  norm is said to be "sub-Gaussian" and a random variable with finite  norm is said to be "sub-exponential". Indeed, the boundedness of the  norm characterizes the limiting behavior of the probability density function:

The  norm may be easily computed from a strictly monotonic moment-generating function.

References

Further reading 
  PDF.
 .
 .
.
 .
 .

External links 
 

Harmonic analysis
Real analysis
Banach spaces